Jeff Groth is an American film editor. He has worked with Todd Phillips on The Hangover Part III, War Dogs, and Joker. His work on Joker earned him a nomination for the Academy Award for Best Film Editing at the 92nd Academy Awards.

Groth also edited the films Project X and The Wedding Ringer, and worked on episodes of the television series Entourage, Community, and Ballers.

Filmography

References

External links

Living people
American film editors
Year of birth missing (living people)
Place of birth missing (living people)